Andrew Richard Koenig (born June 1952) is a former AT&T and Bell Labs researcher and programmer. He is the author of C Traps and Pitfalls and co-author (with Barbara Moo) of Accelerated C++ and Ruminations on C++, and his name is associated with argument-dependent name lookup, also known as "Koenig lookup", though he is not its inventor. He served as the Project Editor of the ISO/ANSI standards committee for C++, and has authored over 150 papers on C++.

Early life and career 
Koenig was born in New York City and is the son of the physicist Dr. Seymour H. Koenig, a former director of the IBM Watson Laboratory, and Harriet Koenig, an author and collector of Native American Indian art.

He graduated from The Bronx High School of Science in 1968  and went on to receive a Bachelor of Science degree and a Master of Science degree from Columbia University in New York. He was a prominent member of the Columbia University Center for Computing Activities (CUCCA) in the late 1960s and 1970s. He wrote the first e-mail program used at the university.

In 1977, he joined the technical staff of Bell Labs in Murray Hill, New Jersey, from which he later retired.

The first book he authored, in 1987, C Traps and Pitfalls, had been motivated by his prior paper and work, mostly as a staff member at Columbia University, on a different computer language, PL/I. In 1977, as a recently hired staff member at Bell Labs, he presented a paper called "PL/I Traps and Pitfalls" at a SHARE meeting in Washington, D.C.

Patents 
 User Authentication System Employing Encryption Functions, #4,590,470. "Combines public-key random challenge-response authentication with hiding the authentication algorithm in a device that makes available only the algorithm's inputs and outputs. That secures the session against eavesdropping and replay and requires no secret information on the host."
 Storing trees in navigable form, #5,530,957. "A technique for storing trees (such as representations of source programs in a programming environment) that completely eliminates space overhead normally associated with storing pointers, while still permitting common navigational operations with reasonable time efficiency."
 Method and apparatus for parsing source code using prefix analysis, #5,812,853, "A technique for speeding up preliminary processing, such as macro preprocessing, in a compiler by remembering useful prefix strings of the input program in a tree-like data structure and keying those strings to remembered states of the compiler."
 Method and apparatus for paging alternate users, #6,057,782, "The idea of allowing paging systems that support acknowledgments to reorder their list of destinations for future pages based on the acknowledgment or lack thereof on previous pages."

Selected bibliography

Books 
 Koenig, Andrew, C Traps and Pitfalls, Reading, Mass.: Addison-Wesley, 1988, c1989. 
 Koenig, Andrew; Moo, Barbara, Ruminations on C++, Addison-Wesley, 1997. 
 Koenig, Andrew; Moo, Barbara, Accelerated C++, Addison-Wesley, 2000.

Papers

1999 
 Andrew Koenig, Barbara Moo: Teaching Standard C++, Part 2. Journal of Object Oriented Programming (JOOP) 11(8): 64-67 (1999)
 Andrew Koenig, Barbara Moo: Teaching Standard C++, Part 3. JOOP 11(9): 59-63 (1999)

1998 
 A Quiet Revolution. JOOP 10(8): 10–13, 16 (1998)
 Report from Morristown. JOOP 10(9): 5-8 (1998)
 A Programming Revolution in Languages Founded on Object Logic. JOOP 11(1): 13-16 (1998)
 Is Abstraction Good? JOOP 11(2): 66-69 (1998)
 Simulating Dynamic Types in C++, Part 1. JOOP 11(3): 76–78, 80 (1998)
 Simulating Dynamic Types in C++, Part 2. JOOP 11(4): 63-67 (1998)
 Why Are Vectors Efficient? JOOP 11(5): 71-75 (1998)
 A Standard C++ Appetizer. JOOP 11(6): 85-87 (1998)
 Andrew Koenig, Barbara Moo: Teaching Standard C++. JOOP 11(7): 11-17 (1998)

1997 
 C++ in the Classroom: A Look Forward. JOOP 10(1): 59-61 (1997)
 Turning an Interface Inside out. JOOP 10(2): 56-58 (1997)
 Which Container Should we Teach First? JOOP 10(3): 10-12 (1997)
 A ++decade of C++. JOOP 10(4): 20–23, 34 (1997)
 Inheritance and Abbreviations. JOOP 10(5): 6–9, 21 (1997)
 Report from London. JOOP 10(6): 11-16 (1997)
 Compile-Time Type Computation. JOOP 10(7): 11-14 (1997)
 The Importance — and Hazards — of Performance Measurement. JOOP 9(8): 58-60 (1997)
 Iterator Iterators and Temporal Sequences. JOOP 9(9): 66–67, 71 (1997)

1996 
 Idiomatic Design — invited talk for ACM OOPSLA '95; published in Post-conference Proceedings and reprinted in abridged form in CACM Vol. 39, No. 11, November, 1996.
 Function Adaptors. JOOP 8(8): 51-53 (1996)
 Compatibility vs. Progress. JOOP 8(9): 48-50 (1996)
 Generic Input Iterators. JOOP 9(1): 72-75 (1996)
 Memory Allocation and C Compatibility. JOOP 9(2): 42–43, 54 (1996)
 C++ as a First Language. JOOP 9(3): 47-49 (1996)
 Design, Behavior, and Expectation. JOOP 9(4): 79-81 (1996)
 Interface and Initiative. JOOP 9(5): 64-67 (1996)
 Arithmetic Sequence Iterators. JOOP 9(6): 38–39, 92 (1996)
 Collection in C++: No Panacea, but Useful. JOOP 9(7): 55-57 (1996)

1995 
 Introduction to Iterator Adaptors. JOOP 7(8): 66-68 (1995)
 Polymorphic Reflections. JOOP 7(9): 65–67, 80 (1995)
 Patterns and Antipatterns. JOOP 8(1): 46-48 (1995)
 Is Programming Like Photography? JOOP 8(2): 73-75 (1995)
 Wrapping up the Standard. JOOP 8(3): 60-62 (1995)
 An Example of Language-Sensitive Design. JOOP 8(4): 56–58, 61 (1995)
 Function Objects, Templates, and Inheritance. JOOP 8(5): 65–68, 84 (1995)
 Variations on a Handle Theme. JOOP 8(6): 77-80 (1995)
 Another Handle Variation. JOOP 8(7): 61-63 (1995)
 Idiomatic design. OOPS Messenger 6(4): 14-19 (1995)
 Andrew Koenig, Bjarne Stroustrup: Foundations for Native C++ Styles Softw., Pract. Exper. 25(S4): S4/45-S4/86 (1995)

1994 
 An anecdote about ML type inference, USENIX Very High Level Languages Symposium, October 1994, Santa Fe
 When to Write Buggy Programs. JOOP 7(1): 80-82 (1994)
 Libraries in Everyday Use. JOOP 7(2): 68–72, 80 (1994)
 Templates and Generic Algorithms. JOOP 7(3): 45-47 (1994)
 Surrogate Classes in C++. JOOP 7(4): 71–72, 80 (1994)
 Generic Iterators. JOOP 7(5): 69-72 (1994)
 Thoughts on Abstraction. JOOP 7(6): 68-70 (1994)

1992 
 Space-Efficient Trees in C++. C++ Conference 1992: 117-130

1991 
 Andrew Koenig, Thomas A. Cargill, Keith E. Gorlen, Robert B. Murray, Michael Vilot: How Useful is Multiple Inheritance in C++? C++ Conference 1991: 81-84

1990 
 Andrew Koenig, Bjarne Stroustrup: Exception Handling for C++. C++ Conference 1990: 149-176

1988 
 Associative arrays in C++, Summer 1988 Usenix Conference (pp. 173–186), San Francisco

1986 
 The Snocone Programming Language, Bell Labs Computing Science Technical Report #124, August 19, 1986

1984 
 Automatic Software Distribution, Summer 1984 Usenix Conference (pp. 87–106), Portland, Oregon

1977 
 "PL/I Traps and Pitfalls", presented at the SHARE conference, 1977.

References

External links
 Andrew Koenig on AcceleratedCpp.com
 Some articles by Andrew Koenig — Dr. Dobb's Journal

Living people
American technology writers
Columbia University alumni
American computer programmers
1952 births
The Bronx High School of Science alumni
Date of birth missing (living people)
Scientists from New York City